Kendre Miller (born June 11, 2002) is an American football running back for the TCU Horned Frogs.

High school career
Miller Mount Enterprise High School in Mount Enterprise, Texas. As a senior, he rushed for 2,508 yards and 34 touchdowns. He committed to Texas Christian University (TCU) to play college football.

College career
As a true freshman at TCU in 2020, he rushed for 388 yards on 54 carries with two touchdowns. As a sophomore in 2021, he was second on the team with 623 rushing yards on 83 carries with seven touchdowns. Miller took over as TCU's starter in 2022.

References

External links
TCU Horned Frogs bio

Living people
Players of American football from Texas
American football running backs
TCU Horned Frogs football players
2002 births